Krásná Hora is a municipality and village in Havlíčkův Brod District in the Vysočina Region of the Czech Republic. It has about 500 inhabitants.

Administrative parts
Villages of Bezděkov, Bratroňov, Broumova Lhota, Čekánov, Hlavňov, Kojkovičky, Vítonín and Volichov are administrative parts of Krásná Hora.

History
The first written mention of Krásná Hora is from 1379.

References

External links

Villages in Havlíčkův Brod District